is the second major-label EP by Japanese rock band Asian Kung-Fu Generation, released on June 11, 2008. The mini-album features songs conceived around the time of the recording of their preceding full-length album, World World World.

Track listing

Personnel 
 Masafumi Gotoh – lead vocals, guitar, lyrics
 Kensuke Kita – lead guitar, background vocals
 Takahiro Yamada –  bass, background vocals
 Kiyoshi Ijichi – drums
 Asian Kung-Fu Generation – producer
 Yusuke Nakamura – art direction

Chart positions

Album

Songs

References 
CDJapan

Asian Kung-Fu Generation EPs
2008 EPs
Japanese-language EPs
Sony Music EPs